Cryptophorellia peringueyi is a species of tephritid or fruit flies in the genus Cryptophorellia of the family Tephritidae.

Distribution
Uganda, Kenya, Zimbabwe, South Africa.

References

Tephritinae
Insects described in 1924
Taxa named by Mario Bezzi
Diptera of Africa